Führer Ex is a  German neo-nazi drama film directed by Winfried Bonengel and based on the autobiographical book Die Abrechnung by Ingo Hasselbach.  It was entered into the 59th Venice International Film Festival.

Plot
Hacky friends Heiko and Tommy dream of escaping from communist Berlin that has become disgusting to them. Attempting to cross the border leads them to jail. In contrast to the sluggish and closed Heiko, the experienced and courageous Tommy is already familiar with the harsh orders of the model prisons of the GDR, where neo-Nazi groups are in charge. Caught in this hell, where only the snitches and mad beasts survive, Heiko escapes, enlisting the friendship of a local fascist leader, and Tommy decides to desperately escape.

They were destined to see each other only four years later, in Berlin, where Heiko, who became a staunch Nazi, commanded a team of skinheads who had left the underground after the fall of the Wall.

Cast
 Aaron Hildebrand as Tommy Zierer
 Christian Blüme as  Heiko Degener
 Jule Flierl as  Beate
 Dennis Grabosch as  Olaf
 Maxwell Richter as  Psycho
 Dieter Laser as  Eduard Kellermann
 Harry Baer as  Friedhelm Kaltenbach
 Matthias Freihof as  Stasi officer

Reviews 
"'Führer Ex' is not a particularly clever or even elegant film. He achieves a directness that otherwise only B-films allow [...] 'Lack of differentiation', 'showmanship', 'one-dimensional characters', 'simplified schemata of cause and effect' — such and similar phrases are the two [Winfried Bonengel and Ingo Hasselbach] have heard so often, until the nausea made further conversations impossible [...] But it could be that Bonengel and Hasselbach, after years of dealing with right-wing youths, simply had no desire, a film for critics and television editors close. That they may have seen their audience elsewhere, on the street perhaps, and that they wanted to get into heads that the ruling discourse just can not reach.", Tobias Kniebe, Süddeutsche Zeitung

References

External links 
  
 Führer Ex  on  filmportal.de

2002 films
German drama films
2002 drama films
Films about neo-Nazism
German films based on actual events
Films scored by Loek Dikker
Films set in East Germany
2000s German films